is a Japanese manga series written and illustrated by Nozomu Tamaki. The manga was serialized in Media Factory's seinen manga magazine Monthly Comic Flapper between 2005 and 2012, and is licensed for publication in English by Seven Seas Entertainment.

Three sequels, Dive in the Vampire Bund, Dance in the Vampire Bund: The Memories of Sledgehammer, and Dance in the Vampire Bund II: Scarlet Order, were published between 2009 and 2015. A fourth sequel, Dance in the Vampire Bund: Age of Scarlet Order, launched in May 2018 and is currently ongoing. All four series, as well as two dōjinshi collections, have been licensed by Seven Seas Entertainment.

The plot follows the emergence of vampires into the human world and explores how fear on both sides changes the world's status quo as they come into conflict with those who desire peace.

A 12-episode anime television series, produced by Shaft, was aired in 2010.

Plot

The story revolves around Mina Țepeș, Princess-Ruler of all vampires, and her werewolf protector Akira Kaburagi Regendorf. Like other vampires, Mina has been in hiding with her people for many years. Seeking to end centuries of isolation, Mina gains permission to create a special district for vampires called "The Bund" off the coast of Tokyo, Japan by paying off the entire national debt of the Japanese government with her family's vast wealth.

Following a discussion show where known vampire movie actor Seiichi Hirai (who was revealed to be an actual vampire) is killed by her during his rampage, Mina reveals to the world the existence of vampires while mentioning her desire for both races to live together as they are residing on "The Bund". However, tensions run high as fearful humans and extremist vampire factions begin to interfere with Mina's wish for peace with the human world. This causes Mina and Akira to defend "The Bund" from these attackers.

The Bund
The Bund (also known as Tokyo Landfill #0) is a special man-made island district that floats in Tokyo Bay off the coast of Tokyo. Mina had it built to serve as a colony for the Vampires and Werewolves.

While Vampires are the primary civilians living in the Bund, Mina's Werewolf guards called the Beowulf also live there full-time for her protection. Humans of great significance (either politically or through personal relationship to Mina) are allowed to visit the Bund. The only connection from the mainland to the Bund is through a single tunnel. The Bund has no bridges or major ports.

There is also an underground city in the Bund that is inhabited by the Fangless (vampires who ripped out their own fangs) as a way for them to live freely and without persecution.

Media

Manga

Written and illustrated by Nozomu Tamaki, Dance in the Vampire Bund began serialization in the January 2006 issue of Media Factory's Monthly Comic Flapper magazine on December 5, 2005, and it concluded with the October 2012 issue on September 5, 2012. The series was collected into fourteen tankōbon volumes between June 2006 and October 2012. Seven Seas Entertainment announced their license to the series at Anime Expo 2007. TO Books began publishing a two-in one omnibus reprint of the series in June 2018. The reprint includes color pages and new short short stories featuring Mina.

The two-volume  spin-off was published in Japan between January 2010 and March 2013. Seven Seas licensed it in October 2010.

A mini-series titled  began serialization in the December 2012 issue of Comic Flapper on November 5, 2012. It ended on November 5, 2013, and was compiled into three volumes between March and December 2013. The mini-series was also licensed by Seven Seas, who announced the series in October 2013.

Tamaki was originally scheduled to launch a second series of the main manga in spring 2013, but it was delayed. He began publishing  in the January 2014 issue of Comic Flapper on December 5, 2013. The series ended on April 4, 2015, and was published as four volumes between April 2014 and April 2015. In June 2014, Seven Seas announced that they had acquired the rights to the sequel.

On March 9, 2018, Tamaki announced via Twitter that he would be starting a new manga in the series, titled , and that the series would be a continuation of Dance in the Vampire Bund II: Scarlet Order. The series launched on TO Books Nico Nico Seiga-based online magazine Comic Corona on May 28, 2018. Seven Seas announced their license to the title in March 2019.

Seven Seas also published two dōjinshi collections, Dance in the Vampire Bund: Forgotten Tales and Dance in the Vampire Bund: Secret Chronicles, which Tamaki had previously released only at Comiket.

Anime

An anime television series adaptation was announced in the August 2009 issue of Monthly Comic Flapper on July 4, 2009. The series was directed by Akiyuki Shinbo and Masahiro Sonoda, and written by Hiroyuki Yoshino, with animation by the studio Shaft. Naoyuki Konno provided character designs for the anime, and Akio Dobashi composed the series' music. A promotional video for the series was shown at the 76th Comiket in October 2009.

The 12-episode series premiered on January 7, 2010, and was broadcast on AT-X, Chiba TV, tvk, TV Saitama, Tokyo MX, TV Aichi, and Sun TV. A compilation episode aired on February 25, 2010, pushing back the broadcast of the series beginning with episode 8, and causing episode 12 to be run in a different timeslot, where it replaced a rerun of He Is My Master.

The series is licensed by Funimation in the United States and by Madman Entertainment in Australia and New Zealand. Manga Entertainment announced its license to the series at the London MCM Expo on May 28, 2011.

Censorship
Initially, Funimation announced that the U.S. release would be released in an edited format, because of "controversial elements which, when taken out of context, could be objectionable to some audiences", and which Funimation considered "inappropriate for U.S. viewing and [...] not essential to the storyline" (nudity involving Princess Mina, who has the outward appearance of a child). Another title, Strike Witches, was released unedited, despite containing some similar elements. After negative fan reaction to edited DVD and Blu-ray releases, Funimation released another statement on March 10, 2010, stating that the company expected to release the show unedited based on the first seven episodes, but would make a final decision once the company had seen the final five episodes to ensure that they complied with U.S. law. Funimation later confirmed that the DVD and Blu-ray release would be unedited. It was released on June 14, 2011.

In July 2011, Manga Entertainment, who had acquired the series for distribution in the United Kingdom, announced that an uncut version of the series had been passed by the BBFC with a "15" rating. This version was released on October 24, 2011.

In June 2015, it was announced that the anime was one of 38 anime and manga titles that had been blacklisted by the Chinese Ministry of Culture, making the distribution of it in any form illegal.

Reception
A number of volumes in the series have made it onto the New York Times Manga Best Sellers list:
 Volume seven was on the list for one week, appearing at seventh place.
 Volume eight was on the list for two weeks, at second and ninth place.
 Volume nine was on the list for two weeks, at eighth and seventh place.
 Volume ten was on the list for two weeks, at third and tenth place.
 Volume eleven was on the list for one week, at second place.
 Volume twelve was on the list for one week at sixth place.
 Volume thirteen was on the list for two weeks, at first and ninth place.
 Volume fourteen was on the list for one week, at second place.

Notes

References

External links
  
  
  at Seven Seas Entertainment
  at Funimation
 
 

2005 manga
2010 Japanese television series debuts
2010 Japanese television series endings
Action anime and manga
Anime and manga about werewolves
Anime series based on manga
Dark fantasy anime and manga
Funimation
Kadokawa Dwango franchises
AT-X (TV network) original programming
Media Factory manga
Psychological horror anime and manga
School life in anime and manga
Seinen manga
Seven Seas Entertainment titles
Shaft (company)
Vampires in anime and manga